Dyakonovo is a rural locality (a village) in Florishchinskoye Rural Settlement, Kolchuginsky District, Vladimir Oblast, Russia. The population was 2 as of 2010. There are 2 streets.

Geography 
Dyakonovo is located 21 km west of Kolchugino (the district's administrative centre) by road. Florishchi is the nearest rural locality.

References 

Rural localities in Kolchuginsky District